Mount Gladstone is a summit in Alberta, Canada.

Mount Gladstone was named for W. S. Gladstone, a pioneer citizen.

References

External links
 Mount Gladstone: Flickr (photo)

Gladstone
Alberta's Rockies